The New Left (NL) is a social-democratic political party in Poland. It is positioned on the centre-left on the political spectrum. Its leaders are Włodzimierz Czarzasty and Robert Biedroń. 

It was formed in 2021, as a merger of the Democratic Left Alliance (SLD) and Spring, although the plans for the merge began in 2020. It is a part of The Left coalition, together with the left-wing Left Together party. It holds pro-European views.

History 
Spring and the Democratic Left Alliance (SLD) initially cooperated in 2019 during the October 2019 parliamentary election, as part of The Left alliance. After the election, the plan to merge the two parties was announced. As a consequence in 2020 SLD changed its name into the New Left as the new party was to be based on the structures of the alliance. However, further plans concerning merger were postponed due to the COVID-19 pandemic.

On 11 June 2021, the Spring's general assembly voted in favour of dissolving the party in order to merge with the SLD.

References

External links

2021 establishments in Poland
Centre-left parties in Europe
Democratic Left Alliance
Political parties established in 2021
Political parties in Poland
Pro-European political parties in Poland
Social democratic parties in Poland